Sahibzada Syed Mohammad Ali Chowdhury (Urdu: سید محمد علی چوہدری), more commonly known as Mohammad Ali Bogra (Urdu: محمد علی بوگڑا) (19 October 1909 – 23 January 1963), or as Mohammad Ali of Bogra, was a Pakistani Bengali politician, statesman, and a career diplomat who served as third prime minister of Pakistan, appointed in this capacity in 1953 until he stepped down in 1955 in favour of Finance Minister Muhammad Ali.

After his education at the Presidency College at the University of Calcutta, he started his political career on Muslim League's platform and joined the Bengal's provincial cabinet of then-Prime Minister H. S. Suhrawardy in the 1940s. After the independence of Pakistan in 1947, he joined the foreign ministry as a diplomat and briefly tenured as Pakistan's ambassador to Burma (1948), High Commissioner to Canada (1949–1952), twice as ambassador to the United States, and as ambassador to Japan (1959–1962).

After he was recalled in 1953 from his services to Pakistan from the United States, he replaced Sir Khwaja Nazimuddin as Prime Minister in an appointment approved by then-Governor-General Sir Malik Ghulam. His foreign policy strongly pursued the strengthening of bilateral relations between Pakistan and the United States, while downplaying relations with the Soviet Union. He also pushed for a stronger military to achieve peace with India and took personal initiatives to prioritize relations with China. At home front, he successfully proposed the popular political formula that laid the foundation of the constitution in 1956 which made Pakistan a federal parliamentary republic. Despite his popular initiatives, he lost his support to then-acting Governor-General Iskander Mirza who re-appointed him as Pakistani Ambassador to the United States which he served until 1959.

In 1962, he joined President Ayub Khan's administration as the Foreign Minister of Pakistan until his death in 1963.

Biography

Family background and education

Mohammad Ali was born in Barisal, East Bengal, India, on 19 October 1909. He was born into an elite and wealthy aristocrat family who were known as the Nawabs of Bogra, traditionally very close to the British monarchy. The prefix, Sahibzada (lit. Prince) is added before his name to represent the Bengali royalty which is customary to give to individuals in India.

His father, Nawabzada Altaf Ali Chowdhury, educated at the St Xavier's College in Calcutta, was a prominent figure in Dacca and was also a local politician who served as the Vice-President of the Muslim League's East Bengal faction. His father, Altaf Ali Chowdhury, was fond of Derby horse race, dog show, and physical sports. His grandfather, Nawab Ali Chowdhury, was also a politician who served as the first Bengali Muslim to be appointed as minister, and played a pioneering role in founding the Dhaka University along with Nawab Sir Khwaja Salimullah Bahadur of Dhaka.

Mohammad Ali Bogra grew up in Bogra, having studied first at the local Hastings House and then educated at the local madrassa in Calcutta. After his matriculation, Bogra went to attend the Presidency College of the Calcutta University where he secured his graduation with a BA degree in political science in 1930.

He was married twice: his first wife was Begum Hamida Mohammad Ali, with whom he had two sons. He later married Aliya Saddy in 1955. His second marriage led to widespread protests against polygamy by women organizations in the country.

Politics (1930–1947)

Before his entrance in the politics, the Bogra family were influential Nawabs active in Bengali politics and Muslim League as a party worker in 1930. He contested in the general elections on a Muslim League's platform held in 1937 from Bogra constituency and sat in the Opposition in the Bengal Legislative Assembly. His uncle, Hasan Ali Chowdhury, also won the election who ran against the Muslim League'e platform. His father, Altaf Ali Chowdhury also successfully defended his constituency and was a member of the ruling Krishak Praja Party.

In 1938, he was elected as chairman of Bogra District which he served until 1942. He served in the opposition until 1943 when the Muslim League had gained political support and he was made parliamentary secretary to then-Chief Minister Khawaja Nazimuddin. In 1946, he was asked by Husyn Suhrawardy to join his cabinet and subsequently held ministerial portfolio of health, finance, and local government. As health minister, he founded the Dhaka Medical College and the Calcutta Lake Medical College.

Bogra supported the Muslim League's call for creation of Pakistan through the partition of British India and successfully defended his constituency in the general elections held in 1945. In 1947, he joined the first Constituent Assembly. While in Dacca in 1948, he received Governor-General Muhammad Ali Jinnah and reportedly dissented on the issue of populist language movement being excluded as an official state language of Pakistan.  He strongly advised Chief Minister Sir Khawaja Nazimuddin to restrain Jinnah from announcing the measure, but was rebuked.

Diplomatic Career (1947–1952)

Ambassadorship to Burma, High Commissionership to Canada, and Ambassadorship to the United States

In 1948, Bogra was asked by Prime Minister Liaquat Ali Khan to be appointed him as the Pakistan ambassador to the Kingdom of Egypt to head the Pakistani diplomatic mission in Cairo, which Bogra declined. Instead, he chose the diplomatic assignment in neighboring Burma and presented his credentials in Rangoon in 1948. Soon after becoming Pakistan Ambassador to Burma, his political philosophy reflected a conservative mindset and took an anti-communist stance when he supported the Burma's military operations against the communists. In 1948, he showed concerns of communist expansion in Pakistan when he reportedly told Pakistani journalists that: "even [sic] if the Burmese Government succeed in suppressing the communists, it is possible they may shift the centre of communist efforts to Pakistan."

In 1949, he left Burma when he was appointed as High Commissioner of Pakistan to Canada which he headed the diplomatic mission until 1952. In 1952, he was made Ambassador to the United States.

He is widely held responsible for leading the country's dependency on the United States, playing an active role in the Pakistani lobby in Washington, D.C., in a view of securing military and economic aid to Pakistan. He helped formulating a policy of "front-line state" in a battle against the Russian communism's containment in the world. After witnessing the presidential elections in the United States in 1952, he argued and later convincing the hardliners of Republican Party and President Dwight D. Eisenhower of Pakistan's anticommunism credentials. He also presented the idea of Pakistani military's the only military in the region to fight against the Soviet Union's expansion, though no threat was even visualized by the American policy makers. In Pakistan's political circle, he was seen as extremely having pro-American views and had fondness of the country, the United States. He also helped negotiated the United States' officer assistance advisory to be dispatch to Pakistan, in an agreement he signed with the United States government in 1952.

In the Foreign Service society of Pakistan, Bogra gained a reputation of "a man who was known for his excessive praise of everything American." He served as Pakistan's ambassador until 1953 but he had become disconcern of the real situation in Pakistan when the leftwing influence began to grow and the public support for the Soviet Union was visible. Pakistani historians held him widely responsibly as one of the principle personalities putting Pakistan in the alliance of the United States against the Soviet Union.

Prime Minister of Pakistan (1953–1955)

Talent ministry and foreign policy

The issue of language movement in East in 1952, the rise of the Socialist Party in Pakistan as well as the violent riots in Lahore against the minority Ahmadiyya in 1953 were the defining factors that led to the dismissal of Prime Minister Khawaja Nazimuddin by then-Governor-General Ghulam Muhammad on 17 April 1953.

Bogra was recalled to Karachi (then-Federal capital) from Washington DC for further consultation but Governor-General Ghulam Muhammad moved to appointed him as a new Prime Minister and the President of the Pakistan Muslim League (PML), which the party had accepted. Under pressure and reluctant, he accepted the new appointment from the Governor-General Ghulam Muhammad but he was more of a diplomat than politician who was unknown to the general public.  Initially, he kept the federal ministries of foreign affairs and defence until appointing a new cabinet. Upon taking over the government, Bogra dismissed the elected government of Fazlul Huq on 30 May 1954 and leveled charges against him on "treasonry". He had appointed then-Defence Secretary Iskander Mirza as the Governor, but this appointment only lasted a couple of months.

Prime Minister Bogra appointed a new cabinet which was known as "Ministry of Talents" which included General Ayub Khan, the Army Cdr-in-C, as the Defence Minister and Major-General (retired) Iskander Ali Mirza as Interior Minister.

His appointment met with great admiration in the United States with U.S. Secretary of State, John Foster Dulles, describing Pakistan as "bulwark of Freedom in Asia" and the Republican Party leader in the United States Senate, William F. Knowland, endorsing the appointment in the United States Congress. During the same time, U.S. President Dwight Eisenhower ordered the immediate shipment of thousand tons of wheat to Pakistan. Bogra was eager to strengthen military ties with the United States, however, the Americans moved cautiously to not damage their strong relations with India, instead pressuring and further dictating Prime Minister Bogra into holding direct talks to India on a series of bilateral issues. His tenure saw him signing multiple treaties with the United States and brought the two countries closer.

His foreign policy was noted for strong "anti-Soviet agitation" which he viewed the Russians as "imperialist" but did not label the same for China despite both being ideologically closed. In 1955, Prime Minister Bogra led Pakistan to attend the Bandung Conference in Indonesia in 1955, which saw the first high-level contact between China and Pakistan.

To authors of foreign policy of Pakistan, Bogra's over-reliance on the United States and his personal anti-communist views destroyed the bilateral relations with the Soviet Union in the 1950s, and put Pakistan's foreign policy under the dictation of the United States despite the popular public opinion.

Under pressure by the United States, Bogra eventually took initiatives to strengthen ties with India by first addressing the Kashmir issue with India. In 1953, Prime Minister Bogra met with Prime Minister Jawaharlal Nehru on the sidelines of the Coronation of Queen Elizabeth II in London. Mohammad Ali Bogra well received Prime Minister Nehru when he paid an official visit to Karachi, and Prime Minister Bogra reciprocated the visit in New Delhi soon after. Prime Minister Bogra enjoyed warm and closer relations with Prime Minister Nehru, as both eventually agreed on the plebiscite in Indian held Kashmir (IoK), but this was not achieved due to Prime Minister Bogra losing support from the leftwing sphere of the country.

In his approach towards India, Prime Minister Bogra pushed for a stronger military to achieve peace in the subcontinent, and argued: "[w]hen there is more equality of military strength, then I am sure that there will be a greater chance of settlement".

Bogra Formula

The Bogra Formula was a political compromise presented and proposed by Prime Minister Bogra on 7 October 1953 before the Constituent Assembly.  Upon taking the control of the Prime Minister's Secretariat, Bogra announced that drafting of the codified Constitution was his primary target, and within six months, he announced a proposal that leads to the drafting of the constitution writ.

The framework proposed the establishment of more effective bicameral parliament that would be composed of National Assembly and the Senate with equal representation from then-five provinces: Punjab, Khyber–Pakhtunkhwa, Balochistan, Sindh, and Bengal. A total of 300 seats were to be reserved for the National Assembly on the basis of proportionate representation and 50 for the Senate that would be equal representation for all the five provinces of the country.

Under this framework, the larger number of constituencies were given to Bengal which had 165 reserved seats in contrast to Punjab which had 75, Khyber–Pakhtunkhwa, which had 24, Sindh which had 19, and Balochistan which had 17 reserved seats. Tribal areas, Karachi metropolitan area, Bahawalpur, Khairpur, Baluchistan States Union, were combined as 24 reserved seats.

In this framework, Bengal had given more seats due to its social homogeneity in the National Assembly than the combined reserved seats for the four provinces and the federal capital which, all were socially heterogeneous and ethically diverse. But combined the reserved seats in the four provinces were in balance with Bengal in the bicameral parliament. Both the houses were given equal power, and in case of a conflict between the two houses, the issue was to be presented before a joint session.

The Bogra framework also addresses the check and balance to avoid the permanent domination by any five provinces where a provision was made that if the President was elected from the four provinces then the Prime Minister was to be elected from East Bengal, and vice versa. The President was to be elected for a term of 5 years from the indirect elections by the Electoral College formed by both houses: National Assembly and the Senate.

The Supreme Court of Pakistan was to be given more power and institutional judicial independence that would permanently replace the Islamic clergy to decide if a law was in accordance with the basic teachings of the Koran or not.

The Bogra formulae was highly popular and widely welcomed by the people as opposed to the Basic Principles Committee led by Prime Minister Nazimuddin as it was seen as great enthusiasm amongst the masses as they considered it as a plan that could bridge the gulf between the two wings of Pakistan and would act as a source of unity for the country.

The compromise did not settled to its ground when Governor-General Ghulam Muhammad, threatened by curbing of his powers, dissolved the Constituent Assembly in 1954 with the support of Pakistan military and civil bureaucracy.

One Unit

Following the failure of reaching concession on Bogra Formula, he began working towards the controversial One Unit program that integrated the Four Provinces into a single nation-state and began advocating for such idea when he quoted:

Dismissal and ambassadorship to the United States (1955–1959)

On 4 August 1955, the Cabinet accepted Governor-General Sir Malik Ghulam Muhammad's request for a leave of absence due to ill health. They chose Interior Minister Iskander Mirza to replace him, and he was sworn in as Acting Governor-General on 7 August.

Soon after the appointment, Acting Governor-General Mirza began having confrontation with Prime Minister Bogra on regional disparity though both were Bengali and were from Bengal, and forced the Prime Minister Bogra to resign that ended Bogra's administration. Acting Governor-General Mirza also dismissed Malik Ghulam and sent a letter of notification in the United Kingdom to remind him of the political developments.

Governor-General Mirza, instead appointment Bogra as Pakistani Ambassador to the United States when he recalled Amjad Ali who was appointed as Finance Minister.

Ayub administration

Foreign Minister (1962–63)

In 1959, he left the ambassadorial assignment after the then-chief martial law administrator Ayub Khan took over the control of the government in 1958 from President Iskander Mirza. Bogra joined Ayub administration when he was appointed as Foreign Minister when he succeeded Jurist Manzur Qadir who was appointed to lead a constitutional commission 8 June 1962.

Soon after his appointment, he visited China where he began talks with the Chinese leadership that eventually led the historical and peaceful settlement with China on Pakistan's final frontiers in North. As Foreign Minister, he guided a pro-Western policy but made efforts to improve relations with the Soviet Union after witnessing the Western and American support India during the Chinese-Indian War in 1962. After visiting Soviet Union with President Ayub, Bogra quoted: There was no such thing as friends forever or enemies forever– only national interests count.

During this time, his health became a serious issue and illness caused him to miss out the meeting over Kashmir but his deputy Zulfikar Ali Bhutto attended in the United States on 26 December 1962. In 1963, Bogra died while staying in Dacca and was buried in Bogra Nawab Palace in East Pakistan, now Bangladesh.

Personal life 

Ali was married twice; his first wife was Begum Hamida Mohammed Ali, and his second wife was a Lebanese lady, Aliya Begum. This marriage was controversial because it constituted polygamy, which was uncommon among the elites of Pakistan.

Death

Bogra died on 23 January 1963 in Dacca. Politician Ajmal Ali Choudhury offered condolences and felt "deep sorrow" for the sudden death.

See also

 Pakistan lobby in the United States
 List of prime ministers of Pakistan

References

External links

|-

|-

|-

|-

|-

1909 births
1963 deaths
People from Barisal
People from Bogra District
Bengali Muslims
University of Calcutta alumni
Nawabs of Bengal
People of East Pakistan
Pakistan Muslim League politicians
Pakistani anti-communists
Pakistani people of Bengali descent
Conservatism in Pakistan
Ambassadors of Pakistan to Myanmar
High Commissioners of Pakistan to Canada
Ambassadors of Pakistan to Japan
Ambassadors of Pakistan to the United States
Prime Ministers of Pakistan
Foreign Ministers of Pakistan
20th-century Pakistani politicians
20th-century diplomats
Muhammad Ali
Pakistan Cricket Board Presidents and Chairmen
20th-century Bengalis
Bangladeshi people of Arab descent
Bengal MLAs 1937–1945